Dmitri Kabanov may refer to:

 Dmitri Aleksandrovich Kabanov (born 1985), Russian footballer
 Dmitri Kabanov (judoka) (born 1980), Russian judoka